PSO J318.5−22 is a rogue planet, an extrasolar object of planetary mass that does not orbit a parent star. It is approximately 80 light-years away and belongs to the Beta Pictoris moving group. The object was discovered in 2013 in images taken by the Pan-STARRS PS1 wide-field telescope. PSO J318.5-22's age is inferred to be 12 million years, the same age as the Beta Pictoris group. Based on its calculated temperature and age, it is classified under the brown dwarf spectral type L7.

The team leader, Michael Liu of the Institute for Astronomy at the University of Hawaii, stated, "We have never before seen an object free-floating in space that looks like this. It has all the characteristics of young planets found around other stars, but it is drifting out there all alone." Current theories about such objects include the possibility that gravitational perturbations may have kicked them out of their planetary systems soon after they formed through planetary accretion, or they may have been formed by some other means. Estimated temperatures inside its clouds exceed . The clouds, made of hot dust and molten iron, show how widespread clouds are in planets and planet-like objects. However, by 2020, modeling showed that the brightness variability could not be unambiguously attributed to clouds.

See also
 CFBDSIR 2149−0403
 2MASS J1119–1137
 Jupiter
 Kepler-22b

References

Exoplanets discovered in 2013
Rogue planets
WISE objects
J21140802-2251358
Beta Pictoris moving group
Capricornus (constellation)
?